Royal Jubilee Commemorative Medals may refer to:

medals issued for British royal jubilees. For a list, see List of jubilees of British monarchs.
medals issued for Danish royal jubilees. For a list, see Orders, decorations, and medals of Denmark.
medals issued for Swedish royal jubilees. For a list, see Swedish Royal Jubilee Commemorative Medals.